Exercise and Sport Sciences Reviews is a quarterly peer-reviewed review journal covering sports medicine and exercise science. It was established in 1973 as a hardcover book series, and became a quarterly peer-reviewed journal in January 2000. It is published by Lippincott Williams & Wilkins, and is an official journal of the American College of Sports Medicine. The editor-in-chief is Sandra K. Hunter, Ph.D., FACSM (Marquette University). According to the Journal Citation Reports, the journal has a 2021 impact factor of 6.642.

References

External links

Sports medicine journals
Quarterly journals
Lippincott Williams & Wilkins academic journals
Publications established in 1973
Academic journals associated with learned and professional societies of the United States
English-language journals
Review journals
Exercise physiology